Jim-Patrick Lienhard (born 30 May 1992) is a German footballer who plays as a midfielder for SC Freiburg II.

Career
Lienhard made his professional debut for Jahn Regensburg in the 3. Liga on 26 July 2014, starting in the home match against MSV Duisburg, which finished as a 3–1 win.

References

External links
 
 

1992 births
Living people
People from Gengenbach
Sportspeople from Freiburg (region)
Footballers from Baden-Württemberg
German footballers
Association football midfielders
SC Freiburg II players
SVN Zweibrücken players
SSV Jahn Regensburg players
SV Eintracht Trier 05 players
FC 08 Homburg players
3. Liga players
Regionalliga players